Creative Control is a 2015 American science fiction drama film, directed by Benjamin Dickinson from a screenplay written by Micah Bloomberg and Dickinson. It stars Dickinson, Nora Zehetner, Dan Gill, Alexia Rasmussen, Gavin McInnes and Reggie Watts. The film had its world premiere at South by Southwest on March 14, 2015. It was released on March 11, 2016, by Amazon Studios and Magnolia Pictures.

Plot
In the near future, an ad executive uses a new reality technology to conduct an affair with his best friend's girlfriend.

Cast

 Benjamin Dickinson as David
 Nora Zehetner as Juliette
 Dan Gill as Wim
 Alexia Rasmussen as Sophie
 Gavin McInnes as Scott
 Reggie Watts as Reggie Watts
 Himanshu Suri as Reny
 Jay Eisenberg as Hollis
 Meredith Hagner as Becky
 Jake Lodwick as Gabe
 Robert Bogue as The Actor
 Jessica Blank as Lucy
 Austin Ku as Teddy
 H. Jon Benjamin as Gary Gass
 Sonja O'Hara as Lauren
 Jon Watts as Commercial Director

Post-production
A campaign was set up on Kickstarter.com to raise funds for the visual effects on the film, $32,000 was raised against a $30,000 goal.

Release
The film had its world premiere at South by Southwest on March 14, 2015. Shortly after, Amazon Studios and Magnolia Pictures acquired distribution rights to the film. The film was released in a limited release on March 11, 2016. It was released on video on demand on April 12, 2016.

Reception
Creative Control received mixed reviews from film critics. It holds a 61% approval rating on review aggregator website Rotten Tomatoes, based on 56 reviews, with an average rating of 6.2/10. On Metacritic, the film holds a rating of 58 out of 100, based on 29 critics, indicating "mixed or average reviews".

Ben Kengisberg of Variety gave the film a positive review writing:  "But a contemplative tone, a zigzagging narrative, superb widescreen black-and-white cinematography and an infusion of dry humor make it feel genuinely fresh. Critical nurturing could help this moody, offbeat indie find its audience." Eric Kohn of Indiewire.com gave the film an A and a positive review writing:  "At times, 'Creative Control' feels just a touch overstylized for its own good, with a few too many slo-mo bits set to classical music to remind us of the refined environment at every turn. Even then, however, the overstatement plays into the movie's favor by elaborating on the illusion of perfection created by twenty-first century machines. Visually scrumptious and slickly told, 'Creative Control' illustrates the power of groundbreaking technology while also indicting its extremes."

References

External links
 
 
 
 
 

2015 films
Amazon Studios films
2010s science fiction drama films
American science fiction drama films
Crowdfunded films
Films about infidelity
Films about virtual reality
Films set in the future
English-language French films
French science fiction drama films
2015 drama films
2010s English-language films
2010s American films
2010s French films